This page summarises the Main Path matches of 2019–20 UEFA Europa League qualifying phase and play-off round.

Times are CEST (UTC+2), as listed by UEFA (local times, if different, are in parentheses).

Preliminary round

Summary

|}
Notes

Matches

2–2 on aggregate. Progrès Niederkorn won on away goals.

Endorgany won 3–1 on aggregate.

Europa won 6–3 on aggregate.

Ballymena United won 2–0 on aggregate.

St Joseph's won 3–1 on aggregate.

KÍ Klaksvík won 9–1 on aggregate.

Cliftonville won 4–0 on aggregate.

First qualifying round

Summary

|}
Notes

Matches

Malmö FF won 11–0 on aggregate.

Connah's Quay Nomads won 3–2 on aggregate.

KuPS won 3–1 on aggregate.

Vaduz won 2–1 on aggregate.

Shamrock Rovers won 4–3 on aggregate.

Ordabasy won 3–0 on aggregate.

Legia Warsaw won 3–0 on aggregate.

CSKA Sofia won 4–0 on aggregate.

3–3 on aggregate. Gżira United won on away goals.

Flora won 4–2 on aggregate.

Maccabi Haifa won 5–2 on aggregate.

Debrecen won 4–1 on aggregate.

Čukarički won 8–0 on aggregate.

1–1 on aggregate. Jeunesse Esch won on away goals.

FCSB won 4–1 on aggregate.

Crusaders won 5–2 on aggregate.

Brøndby won 4–3 on aggregate.

Molde won 7–1 on aggregate.

Rangers won 10–0 on aggregate.

Progrès Niederkorn won 3–2 on aggregate.

Levski Sofia won 4–0 on aggregate.

Zrinjski Mostar won 6–0 on aggregate.

Neftçi Baku won 9–0 on aggregate.

Fehérvár won 5–1 on aggregate.

Shakhtyor Soligorsk won 2–0 on aggregate.

Olimpija Ljubljana won 4–3 on aggregate.

Honvéd won 4–2 on aggregate.

Alashkert won 6–1 on aggregate.

2–2 on aggregate. Spartak Trnava won 3–2 on penalties.

Chikhura Sachkhere won 4–2 on aggregate.

Dinamo Tbilisi won 7–0 on aggregate.

Kairat won 4–2 on aggregate.

3–3 on aggregate. DAC Dunajská Streda won on away goals.

Apollon Limassol won 6–0 on aggregate.

Ventspils won 3–1 on aggregate.

4–4 on aggregate. Stjarnan won on away goals.

Haugesund won 6–1 on aggregate.

1–1 on aggregate. KÍ Klaksvík won on away goals.

Liepāja won 3–2 on aggregate.

IFK Norrköping won 4–1 on aggregate.

Aberdeen won 4–2 on aggregate.

Domžale won 5–3 on aggregate.

Hapoel Be'er Sheva won 2–1 on aggregate.

Budućnost Podgorica won 6–1 on aggregate.

Universitatea Craiova won 6–4 on aggregate.

Pyunik won 5–4 on aggregate.

AEK Larnaca won 2–0 on aggregate.

Second qualifying round

Summary

|+Main Path

|}
Notes

Matches

IFK Norrköping won 3–0 on aggregate.

Hapoel Be'er Sheva won 3–1 on aggregate.

Neftçi Baku won 4–0 on aggregate.

Espanyol won 7–1 on aggregate.

Atromitos won 5–3 on aggregate.

Haugesund won 3–2 on aggregate.

AEK Larnaca won 7–0 on aggregate.

Legia Warsaw won 1–0 on aggregate.

Zrinjski Mostar won 3–2 on aggregate.

Pyunik won 2–1 on aggregate.

Brøndby won 5–3 on aggregate.

Vaduz won 2–1 on aggregate.

Dinamo Tbilisi won 5–0 on aggregate.

Yeni Malatyaspor 3–2 on aggregate.

Eintracht Frankfurt won 4–2 on aggregate.

Malmö FF won 5–4 on aggregate.

Molde won 3–1 on aggregate.

Aberdeen won 6–1 on aggregate.

Gent won 7–5 on aggregate.

Zorya Luhansk won 4–1 on aggregate.

1–1 on aggregate. CSKA Sofia won 4–3 on penalties.Torino won 7–1 on aggregate.Luzern won 2–0 on aggregate.Rangers won 2–0 on aggregate.Ventspils won 6–2 on aggregate.Strasbourg won 4–3 on aggregate.Mladá Boleslav won 4–3 on aggregate.Apollon Limassol won 4–3 on aggregate.AZ won 3–0 on aggregate.FCSB won 5–3 on aggregate.3–3 on aggregate. Lokomotiv Plovdiv won on away goals.Wolverhampton Wanderers won 6–1 on aggregate.Aris won 1–0 on aggregate.Vitória de Guimarães won 5–0 on aggregate.0–0 on aggregate. Universitatea Craiova won 3–1 on penalties.Shakhtyor Soligorsk won 2–0 on aggregate.Partizan won 4–0 on aggregate.Third qualifying round
Summary

|+Main Path

|}

MatchesHapoel Be'er Sheva won 4–2 on aggregate.Torino won 6–1 on aggregate.2–2 on aggregate. Antwerp won on away goals.Apollon Limassol won 5–2 on aggregate.Feyenoord won 5–1 on aggregate.Braga won 7–3 on aggregate.Molde won 4–3 on aggregate.Strasbourg won 2–0 on aggregate.Spartak Moscow won 5–3 on aggregate.FCSB won 1–0 on aggregate.Wolverhampton Wanderers won 8–0 on aggregate.Rangers won 7–3 on aggregate.AZ won 4–0 on aggregate.Gent won 4–1 on aggregate.Legia Warsaw won 2–0 on aggregate.PSV Eindhoven won 1–0 on aggregate.Rijeka won 4–0 on aggregate.Vitória de Guimarães won 9–0 on aggregate.Eintracht Frankfurt won 6–0 on aggregate.Partizan won 3–2 on aggregate.Malmö FF won 3–1 on aggregate.Zorya Luhansk won 2–1 on aggregate.Bnei Yehuda won 4–3 on aggregate.Espanyol won 6–0 on aggregate.Trabzonspor won 4–3 on aggregate.AEK Athens won 3–1 on aggregate.Play-off round
Summary

|+Main Path

|}

MatchesWolverhampton Wanderers won 5–3 on aggregate.Rangers won 1–0 on aggregate.Vitória de Guimarães won 1–0 on aggregate.PSV Eindhoven won 7–0 on aggregate.3–3 on aggregate. Trabzonspor won on away goals.Feyenoord won 6–0 on aggregate.Gent won 3–2 on aggregate.Espanyol won 5–3 on aggregate.Partizan won 3–2 on aggregate.Braga won 3–1 on aggregate.Malmö FF won 4–0 on aggregate.Eintracht Frankfurt won 3–1 on aggregate.AZ won 5–2 on aggregate.''

Notes

References

External links

1M
UEFA Europa League qualifying rounds